The World Group was the highest level of Fed Cup (women's tennis) competition in 2013. First seeds Czech Republic were the defending champions, but they were defeated in the semi-finals by Italy. Italy won the final against Russia.

Participating teams

Draw

First round

Czech Republic vs. Australia

United States vs. Italy

Russia vs. Japan

Slovakia vs. Serbia

Semifinals

Czech Republic vs. Italy

Russia vs. Slovakia

Final

Italy vs. Russia

References

See also
Fed Cup structure

World Group